"They Don't Make 'Em Like That Anymore" is a song written by Chris Farren and Jeffrey Steele, and recorded by American country music group Boy Howdy.  It was released in March 1994 as the second single from their EP She'd Give Anything. The song reached No. 2 on the Billboard Hot Country Singles & Tracks chart in July of that year.

Chart positions
"They Don't Make 'Em Like That Anymore" debuted at number 60 on the U.S. Billboard Hot Country Singles & Tracks for the week of April 2, 1994

Year-end charts

References

1994 singles
1993 songs
Boy Howdy songs
Songs written by Jeffrey Steele
Curb Records singles
Songs written by Chris Farren (country musician)
Song recordings produced by Chris Farren (country musician)